Luba Kadison Buloff (December 13, 1906 – May 4, 2006) was a Lithuanian Jewish actress, active for decades in Yiddish theatre, in both Europe and the United States.

Early life
Luba Kadison was born in Kovno, Lithuania. She moved with her family to Vilna during World War I, and then to Warsaw while she was still in her teens. Her father, Leib Kadison, was a co-founder of the Vilna Troupe. From a young age, Luba Kadison was playing juvenile roles with the Vilna Troupe, and moved into female leads as she grew. While attending a drama school (her only formal education), she played a small role in the 1920 premiere of S. Ansky's The Dybbuk.

Career
With the Vilna Troupe, Luba Kadison played the bride (the female lead) in The Dybbuk, and starred in Ossip Dimov's Yoshke Muzicant (directed by her future husband Joseph Buloff). Yoshke Muzicant was a major success in Bucharest, drawing the attention of Maurice Schwartz; Kadison and Buloff moved to the United States in 1927, both to work with Schwartz at the Yiddish Art Theater in New York City. Both were fixtures in the Yiddish theatre scene in New York for many years after they arrived. They performed in South American tours in 1933 and 1940. She played the wife in a 1951 Yiddish adaptation of Death of a Salesman. In 1954, she had a leading role in the Yiddish musical Wish Me Luck!

In 1962, Luba Kadison and Helen Waren adapted three stories by Anton Chekhov for English performance. In 1970 Kadison adapted Singer's The Brothers Ashkenazi, for a production starring and directed by her husband Joseph Buloff. The New York Times reviewer judged her adaptation pleasing, saying "Miss Kadison's Yiddish lines are flavorsome and supple." Luba Buloff also worked as a translator, and taught acting.

In 1992, her memoirs written with Joseph Buloff, On Stage, Off Stage, was published.

Personal life
Luba Kadison married fellow actor Joseph Buloff by 1925, in Bucharest. They had a daughter, Barbara. Kadison was widowed when Joseph Buloff died in 1985. Luba Kadison died in 2006, a few months before her 100th birthday. She was the last survivor from the Vilna Troupe.

The papers of Joseph Buloff and Luba Kadison are archived at the YIVO Institute for Jewish Research, in New York City.

References

External links
Sound clips of an oral history interview given by Luba Kadison in the 1980s, at the Museum of Family History; with several photographs of Kadison.
Transcript of an oral history interview given by Luba Kadison in 1978, at the New York Public Library.

Luba Kadison's listing on IBDB.

1906 births
2006 deaths
Actors from Kaunas
Polish emigrants to the United States
Jewish American actresses
Yiddish theatre performers
20th-century American women
20th-century American people
20th-century American Jews
21st-century American Jews
21st-century American women
American Ashkenazi Jews